Dündarlı is a village in the Şehitkamil District, Gaziantep Province, Turkey. The village is inhabited by Turkmens of the Qiziq tribe, but was formed by Ayrums, and had a population of 307 in 2021.

References

Villages in Şehitkamil District